The Last Paradises: On the Track of Rare Animals (in German Die letzen Paradiese) is the title of a German nature documentary from 1967. It was filmed by Eugen Schuhmacher and Helmuth Barth.

Background
The filming began in spring 1959. Schuhmacher and his cinematographer Helmuth Barth (who has later worked on the Academy Award-winning movie The Hellstrom Chronicle) have gone on a 7-year travel (from 1959 to 1966) to film several of the most endangered animals of the world. It had costs of about $250,000. There is also a book reference which was translated into many languages. It was narrated by German actor Wolf Ackva.

Plot summary
After an animated introduction about the history of extinct species (e.g. the quagga, the great auk and the dodo) it has gone to 60 countries and territories (including Turkey, Spain, Germany, Poland, Australia, Borneo, Chile, Spitzbergen, New Zealand, Papua New Guinea, India, Java, United States, and Peru) on all continents and to the most famous national parks. Species like the Hamilton's frog (Leiopelma hamiltoni) or the Javan rhinoceros were filmed for the very first time. Other sequences including footage of the kakapo, the takahe, the dancing of the red-crowned cranes, the fishing Kodiak bears, the whooping crane, the Asiatic lion, the Komodo dragon, the tuatara, the indri, and the birds of paradise. In particular the filming of the whooping cranes was the result of adventurous circumstances. Because the whooping crane was among the rarest birds in the world in the early 1960s there was no permission to entry the Aransas National Wildlife Refuge in Texas. Fortunately the cranes were provided with food by a plane and during that time the birds came to a wetland in the proximity of the fence. Schuhmacher and Barth planted themselves in a boat in a channel in front of the fence and were able to take some footage from a female and a chicken.

Awards
The film received awards at the Documentary film festival at Trento

References
Eugen Schuhmacher (1967): The Last Paradises: On the track of rare animals. Translated by Gwynne Vevers and Winwood Reade. Garden City, NY: Doubleday & Company, Inc., Natural History Press.
Eugen Schuhmacher (1970): Ich filmte 1000 Tiere. Ullstein Verlag, Berlin (German)

External links 
 

1967 films
1967 documentary films
German documentary films
West German films
1967 in the environment
Films about animals
Documentary films about nature
Environmental films
1960s German films